The 2013–14 North Carolina Tar Heels women's basketball team will represent the University of North Carolina at Chapel Hill during the 2013–14 NCAA Division I women's basketball season. The Tar Heels, led by twenty-eighth year head coach Sylvia Hatchell, they played their games at Carmichael Arena and are members of the Atlantic Coast Conference.

In October 2013, Coach Hatchell was diagnosed with acute myeloid leukemia. While she remained involved in the team's daily operations, assistant coach Andrew Calder would take over for any practice and gametime decisions for the season.

Roster

Schedule

|-
!colspan=9 style="background:#56A0D3; color:#FFFFFF;"| Exhibition

|-
!colspan=9 style="background:#56A0D3; color:#FFFFFF;"| Non-conference regular season

|-
!colspan=9 style="background:#56A0D3; color:#FFFFFF;"| ACC regular season

|-
!colspan=9 style="background:#56A0D3; color:#FFFFFF;"| ACC Women's Tournament

|-
!colspan=9 style="background:#56A0D3; color:#FFFFFF;"| NCAA Women's Tournament

Source

Rankings

See also
2013–14 North Carolina Tar Heels men's basketball team

References

North Carolina
North Carolina Tar Heels women's basketball seasons
North Carolina
North Car
North Car